Tomáš Slovák (born April 5, 1983) is a Slovak professional ice hockey defenceman. He is currently a free agent. 

He was originally drafted 42nd overall by the Nashville Predators in the 2001 NHL Entry Draft.

Playing career
Slovak played as a youth in the developmental program of hometown club, HC Košice, from 1997 to 2001. He made his Slovak Extraliga debut with Košice in the 1999–00 season, appearing in a pair of games. After impressing on the international junior stage for the Slovak junior team, Slovak was selected by the Nashville Predators in the second round, 42nd overall, in the 2001 NHL Entry Draft.

With intention to pursue an NHL career, Slovak opted to play major junior hockey in North America after he was drafted 4th overall in the 2001 CHL Import Draft by the Kelowna Rockets of the Western Hockey League (WHL). Slovak enjoyed a standout second season with the Rockets in 2002–03, contributing with 71 points in 65 games to lead the league amongst defensemen. Having concluded his junior career, Slovak's was expected to compete for a roster position on the Predators defense corps. However, with the Predators going heavy in 2003 NHL Entry Draft on blue chip defenseman Ryan Suter and Shea Weber, his rights were traded by the Nashville Predators to the Colorado Avalanche in exchange for Sergei Soin on June 21, 2003.

On July 15, 2003, Slovak agreed to a three-year, entry-level contract with the Avalanche. After attending the Avalanche's training camp, Slovak was assigned to begin his rookie season with affiliate, Hershey Bears, of the American Hockey League. In the 2003–04 season, Slovak split time between the Bears and the Reading Royals of the ECHL. He contributed with 11 points in 43 AHL games. In the following 2004–05 season, with his role affected with the Bears by the 2004–05 NHL Lockout, Slovak returned to Slovakia after just one game with the Bears and played out the season with HC Košice.

Slovak returned to North America for the final year of his entry-level contract with the Avalanche in the 2005–06 season. He was familiarly assigned by Colorado to the AHL, playing with new partner the Lowell Lock Monsters. In 59 games, Slovak produced just 8 assists from the blueline, signalling the end of his tenure within the Avalanche organization.

On the opening day of free agency, Slovak was unable to gain NHL interest and opted to sign a contract with Swedish club, Mora IK of the then Elitserien on July 1, 2006. He played just 6 games with Mora in the 2006–07 season, before embarking on a tumultuous  year by playing in four separate European teams in three different leagues.

From his return to European hockey, Slovak adapted to his journeyman status and has played in 6 countries and 14 clubs.

Playing predominately in the Czech Extraliga over the last 7 years, Slovak agreed to extend his playing career by signing a one-year contract with Piráti Chomutov on May 1, 2017. His signing marked a return to Chomutov after 6 years from his first stint in the Czech 1st Division.

Career statistics

Regular season and playoffs

International

Awards and honors

References

External links

1983 births
Living people
Augsburger Panther players
Avtomobilist Yekaterinburg players
Brynäs IF players
DVTK Jegesmedvék players
HC Dinamo Minsk players
HK Gomel players
Hershey Bears players
Ilves players
Kelowna Rockets players
HC Košice players
Lowell Lock Monsters players
Mora IK players
MsHK Žilina players
Nashville Predators draft picks
HC Oceláři Třinec players
Piráti Chomutov players
HC Plzeň players
Reading Royals players
SaiPa players
Stadion Hradec Králové players
Slovak ice hockey defencemen
Sportspeople from Košice
Slovak expatriate ice hockey players in Canada
Slovak expatriate ice hockey players in the United States
Slovak expatriate ice hockey players in Sweden
Slovak expatriate ice hockey players in Finland
Slovak expatriate ice hockey players in Germany
Slovak expatriate ice hockey players in Russia
Slovak expatriate ice hockey players in the Czech Republic
Slovak expatriate sportspeople in Belarus
Slovak expatriate sportspeople in Hungary
Expatriate ice hockey players in Hungary
Expatriate ice hockey players in Belarus